"I'm Gonna Miss You Forever" is a song by American singer Aaron Carter, released in 1998 as the third single from his debut album, Aaron Carter (1997). The single found success in European countries, particularly Sweden, where it reached the top 10, and Germany and Norway, where it reached number 13.

Track listing
Maxi CD single
 "I'm Gonna Miss You Forever" (radio edit) – 3:36
 "I Will Be Yours" – 3:34
 "I'm Gonna Miss You Forever" (album version) – 3:49

Charts

Weekly charts

Year-end charts

References

1997 songs
1998 singles
Aaron Carter songs